The Harrison-Meldola Memorial Prizes are annual prizes awarded by Royal Society of Chemistry to chemists in Britain who are 34 years of age or below. The prize is given to scientist who demonstrate 
the most meritorious and promising original investigations in chemistry and published results of those investigations. There are 3 prizes given every year, each winning £5000 and a medal. Candidates are not permitted to nominate themselves.

They were begun in 2008 when two previous awards, the Meldola Medal and Prize and the Edward Harrison Memorial Prize, were joined together.  They commemorate Raphael Meldola and Edward Harrison.

Winners of the Harrison-Meldola Memorial Prizes

Source: Royal Society of Chemistry

2022 
 Volker Deringer, University of Oxford
 Marina Freitag, Newcastle University
 Paul McGonigal, Durham University

2021 

Nicholas Chilton, University of Manchester
Fernanda Duarte, University of Oxford
Ceri Hammond, Imperial College London

2020 

Thomas Bennett, University of Cambridge
 Anthony Green, University of Manchester
Sihai Yang, University of Manchester

2019 

 Rebecca Melen, Cardiff University
 Robert Phipps, University of Cambridge
Mathew Powner, University College London

2018 

 Kim Jelfs, Imperial College London
 Daniele Leonori, University of Manchester
David Mills, University of Manchester

2017 
 Matthew Baker, University of Strathclyde
 Mark Crimmin, Imperial College London
 Elaine O'Reilly, The University of Nottingham

2016 
 Gonçalo Bernardes, University of Cambridge
 Susan Perkin, University of Oxford
 Sarah Staniland, The University of Sheffield

2015 
 Adrian Chaplin, University of Warwick
 David Scanlon, University College London
 Robert Paton, University of Oxford

2014
 David Glowacki, University of Bristol
 , University of Cambridge
 Matthew Fuchter, Imperial College London

2013
 Andrew Baldwin, University of Oxford
 John Bower, University of Bristol
 Aron Walsh, University of Bath

2012
 Michael Ingleson, University of Manchester
 Tuomas Knowles, University of Cambridge
 Marina Kuimova, Imperial College London

2011
 Craig Banks, Manchester Metropolitan University
 Tomislav Friscic, University of Cambridge
 Philipp Kukura, University of Oxford

2010
 Scott Dalgarno, Heriot-Watt University
 Andrew Goodwin, University of Oxford
 Nathan S Lawrence, Schlumberger Cambridge Research

2009
 Eva Hevia, University of Strathclyde
 Petra Cameron, University of Bath
 , University of Cambridge

Previous winners of the Meldola Medal and Prize

The Meldola Medal and Prize commemorated Raphael Meldola, President of the Maccabaeans and the Institute of Chemistry. The last winners of the prize in 2007 were Hon Lam from the University of Edinburgh, and Rachel O'Reilly of the University of Cambridge.

Previous winners of the Edward Harrison Memorial Prize

The Edward Harrison Memorial Prize commemorated the work of Edward Harrison who was credited with producing the first serviceable gas mask. The last winner of the prize was Katherine Holt of University College London.

See also

 List of chemistry awards

References

External links
 

Awards established in 2008
Awards of the Royal Society of Chemistry
Awards with age limits